A New Sound... A New Star... (subtitled Jimmy Smith at the Organ Vol. 1) is the debut album by the American jazz organist Jimmy Smith, recorded in 1956 and released on the Blue Note label. The album was rereleased on CD combined with Smith's following two LP's A New Sound A New Star: Jimmy Smith at the Organ Volume 2 and The Incredible Jimmy Smith at the Organ.

Reception

The AllMusic review by Scott Yanow stated:

Track listing
 "The Way You Look Tonight" (Dorothy Fields, Jerome Kern) – 5:04
 "You Get 'Cha" – 4:23 (Jimmy Smith)
 "Midnight Sun" (Sonny Burke, Lionel Hampton, Johnny Mercer) – 4:26
 "Oh, Lady Be Good!" (George Gershwin, Ira Gershwin) – 5:49
 "The High and the Mighty" (Dimitri Tiomkin, Ned Washington) – 4:21
 "But Not for Me" (Gershwin, Gershwin) – 4:30
 "The Preacher" (Horace Silver) – 4:35
 "Tenderly" (Walter Gross, Jack Lawrence) – 3:56
 "Joy" (Johann Sebastian Bach) – 3:13
 Recorded at Rudy Van Gelder Studio, Hackensack, New Jersey on February 18, 1956

Personnel
Musicians
Jimmy Smith – Hammond organ
Thornel Schwartz – guitar
Bay Perry – drums

Technical
 Alfred Lion – producer
 Rudy Van Gelder – engineer
 Reid Miles – cover design
 Francis Wolff – photography
 Babs Gonzales – liner notes

References

Blue Note Records albums
Jimmy Smith (musician) albums
1956 debut albums
Albums produced by Alfred Lion
Albums recorded at Van Gelder Studio